Catherine of France (4 February 1378 – November 1388) was a princess of France as the daughter of Charles V, King of France, and became the Countess of Montpensier as the wife of John of Berry, Count of Montpensier.

Life 
Catherine of France was born in Paris on 4 February 1378 as the ninth child and fifth daughter of Charles V, King of France ("Charles the Wise", 1338–1380) and his wife, born Joanna of Bourbon (1338–1378). She had had eight older siblings, only two or three of whom were still alive at the time of her birth: Charles, the Dauphin aged 9, Louis, aged 5, and maybe John, aged 3-4 or 1-2. Her mother died while delivering Catherine, which deeply upset her father. He died only two years later, making Catherine's oldest living brother Charles (1368–1368) king. 

In 1386, at the age of eight, Catherine married John of Berry, Count of Montpensier, also known as John of Valois (1375/1376–1397), who was between the ages of nine and eleven. He was the oldest living son and heir of John, Duke of Berry ("John the Magnificent",  1340–1416), and Catherine's first cousin once removed through their shared descendance from John II, King of France ("John the Good", 1319–1364). 

In November 1388, Catherine died at the age of ten of unknown causes, three months short of her eleventh birthday. Her death meant that only two of her parents' nine children survived to adulthood, Charles VI, King of France (1368–1422) and Louis I, Duke of Orléans (1372–1407). She hadn't had any children due to both her and her husband's young age. Two years later her widower married Anne de Bourbon (1380–1408), and predeceased his father in 1397.

Ancestors

References

Sources

1378 births
1388 deaths
House of Valois
French princesses
Countesses of Montpensier
14th-century French people
14th-century French women
Daughters of kings

Royalty and nobility who died as children